Camallanus is a genus of parasitic roundworms in the family Camallanidae.

Camallanus cotti is a parasite of several freshwater fish species including Tachysurus fulvidraco, the yellowhead catfish or Korean bullhead, a species of bagrid catfish found in eastern Asia from Siberia to China, Korea, Vietnam and Laos. Species such as  Camallanus fotedari are parasites of aquarium fish. Fenbendazole, a drug, has gained prominence among aquarists as an effective treatment for Camallanus roundworm infestations in freshwater tropical fish.

Camallanus trispinosus has been found in a captive Indian star tortoise (Geochelone elegans).

References 

 Sur les nématodes du genre Goezia Zeder. A Railliet, A Henry, Bulletin de la Société de pathologie exotique (Bull. Soc. Path, exot), 1915
 Sur les Nématodes du genre Camallanus Raill. et Henry, 1915 (Cucullanus Auct., non Mueller, 1777). A Railliet, Bulletin de la Société de pathologie exotique (Bull. Soc. Path, exot), 1915
 Présence du nématode Camallanus fotedari dans le tube digestif de poissons d'aquarium de diverses provenances. Y Campana-Rouget, AJ Petter, M Kremer, B Molet..., Bull. Acad. Vét. Fr, 1976
 On a reconstruction of the genus Camallanus Railliet and Henry, 1915. Y Liang-Sheng, Journal of Helminthology, 1960

External links 

 

Secernentea genera
Camallanida